The 2004 Karnataka Legislative Assembly election took place on 20 April and 26 April 2004 in 224 constituencies in Karnataka, India. The elections were conducted to elect the government in the state of Karnataka for the next five years. The votes were counted on 13 May 2004. None of the parties were able to win a majority and the Bharatiya Janata Party emerged as the single largest party with 79 seats. Subsequently, the Indian National Congress with 65 members and Janata Dal (Secular) with 58 members formed a coalition to run the government with Dharam Singh as the chief minister. This was the first ever coalition government in the state.

Results

Successful Candidates

Government formation 
In the elections, the BJP emerged as the single largest party winning 79 of the 224 seats. However, the Indian National Congress with 65 members and the Janata Dal (Secular) with 58 members formed a coalition to run the government. Dharam Singh of the Congress was sworn in as the chief minister on 28 May 2004. However, in early 2006, the JD(S) withdrew its support to the government and instead forged an alliance with the BJP. A new government was formed with H. D. Kumaraswamy of the JD(S) as Chief minister and B.S. Yeddyurappa of the BJP as Deputy Chief minister .

References

State Assembly elections in Karnataka
2000s in Karnataka
2004 State Assembly elections in India